Owen George Lloyd (born April 30, 1957) is a former professional ice hockey defenceman.

Born in North Vancouver, British Columbia, Lloyd was drafted 77th overall by the Cleveland Barons in the 1977 NHL amateur draft and 85th overall by the Edmonton Oilers in the 1977 WHA Amateur Draft.  Lloyd played three games for the Oilers in the WHA during the 1977–78 season, scoring one assist and acquiring four penalty minutes.

He also played for several minor leagues teams during his career including the Central Hockey League's Phoenix Roadrunners, Houston Apollos and the Wichita Wind and brief spells in the American Hockey League for the Springfield Indians and the International Hockey League for the Milwaukee Admirals.

Career statistics

External links
 

1957 births
Living people
Canadian ice hockey defencemen
Cleveland Barons (NHL) draft picks
Edmonton Oilers (WHA) draft picks
Edmonton Oilers (WHA) players
Houston Apollos players
Ice hockey people from British Columbia
Medicine Hat Tigers players
Milwaukee Admirals (IHL) players
Pacific Southwest Hockey League players
People from North Vancouver
Phoenix Roadrunners (CHL) players
San Diego Hawks players
Seattle Breakers players
Springfield Indians players
Western International Hockey League players
Wichita Wind players